Thomas Carlisle Livingstone-Learmonth (5 January 1906 – 24 April 1931) was a British hurdler. He competed at the 1928 Olympics in the 400 metres hurdles and finished in fifth place.

The career of Livingstone-Learmonth was overshadowed by Lord Burghley, who beat him in the 440 yd hurdles at all 1926–1928 AAA Championships. Earlier in 1925 Livingstone-Learmonth set a British record in the 220 yd hurdles, but Burghley has bettered it within three weeks. In the semifinals of the 1928 Olympics, Livingstone-Learmonth set another British record in the 400 m hurdles, at 54.0 s, but it was bettered next day by Burghley in the final. Livingstone-Learmonth died of meningitis aged 25 while on a diplomatic mission in Sudan.

His grandfather was Thomas Livingstone Learmonth, an early European settler of Australia.

References

Athletes (track and field) at the 1928 Summer Olympics
Olympic athletes of Great Britain
British male hurdlers
1906 births
1931 deaths
Neurological disease deaths in Sudan
Infectious disease deaths in Sudan
Deaths from meningitis